The 2013 888casino Champion of Champions was a professional non-ranking snooker tournament held between 19 and 24 November 2013 at the Ricoh Arena in Coventry, England. This was the first time that 888casino sponsored the event, which was broadcast live on ITV4.

The event was last held in 1980, when Doug Mountjoy won in the final 10–8 against John Virgo.

Ronnie O'Sullivan won his 52nd professional title by defeating Stuart Bingham 10–8 in the final.

Prize fund
The breakdown of prize money for this year is shown below:
 Winner: £100,000
 Runner-up: £50,000
 Semi-finals: £20,000
 Group runner-up: £10,000
 Group semi-finals: £5,000
 Total: £270,000

Players
Players qualified for the event by winning important tournaments from the start of the 2012-13 season to the 2013 Indian Open. The important events included all rankings events and winners the following non-rankings events: 2012 Premier League Snooker, 2013 Masters, 2013 Players Championship Grand Final and 2013 Championship League. With only 14 different players winning one of the qualifying events, the remaining two places were allocated to the highest ranked players who had not already qualified.

The following 16 players qualified for the tournament:

Main draw

Final

Century breaks

 130, 130, 119, 103, 101  Ronnie O'Sullivan
 129, 125, 119, 113, 112, 105  Neil Robertson
 127, 112  Ali Carter
 125  Stephen Maguire
 117, 113, 103  Mark Selby
 111, 109, 109  Stuart Bingham
 104  Ding Junhui
 102  Martin Gould

References

External links
 

2013
2013 in snooker
2013 in English sport
Sports competitions in Coventry
2010s in Coventry
November 2013 sports events in the United Kingdom